Chaahat is a 1996 Indian Hindi language romantic musical film by director Mahesh Bhatt. The cast of this film is Shah Rukh Khan, Pooja Bhatt, Naseeruddin Shah, Ramya Krishnan and Anupam Kher. Shah Rukh Khan acquired the rights of this film from Mahesh Bhatt in October 2013 under the banner, Red Chillies Entertainment. The film was remade in Odia as Prem Rogi in 2009.

Plot 
Roop Singh Rathore  is a singer in Rajasthan just like his father, who is now sick and needs immediate medical care in Bombay. One day, while he is singing at Ajay Narang's hotel, Ajay's sister Reshma falls in love with Roop. Reshma is a spoiled girl and Ajay sees through all of her wishes. Unfortunately, Roop is in love with a nurse named Pooja. Meanwhile, Reshma is obsessed with Roop, and asks her brother to call him again to sing in their hotel. But when she sees that all the girls are flattered over Roop, she gets very angry and asks him to sing only for her now onwards. However, Roop prefers to work for the rival, Patel than take this offer. Ajay's obsession with keeping his sister happy at all costs comes into play and Patel is brutally beaten by him until he agrees to throw Roop out of his hotel. Desperately in need of money for his father's operation, Roop has no option but to agree with Reshma. Roop breaks up with Pooja.

The operation of his father is successful, but his father is saddened by his situation and decides to leave Bombay. Roop later tries to leave Bombay himself, along with his father and Pooja, but his plans are interrupted when Reshma tries to commit suicide. Nevertheless, Pooja and Roop get married. Frustrated with such a turn of events, Reshma and her brother Ajay devise many plans to make their lives miserable. he puts Roop's father on a gallows with Roop on his feet, leaves with Pooja and asks Roop to save Pooja or his father. Roop's father kicks Roop, sacrificing himself so that he could save Pooja. Roop crashes into Ajay's party where Pooja is also held strapped. While in the fight, Reshma brings Pooja and threatens to kill Pooja if Roop won't stop fighting with her brother. Ajay tries to shoot Roop, but Pooja, who just sees him, pushes Roop and Reshma gets shot, getting killed. Narang is left in a shocked and catatonic state, while Roop and Pooja escape.

Cast 
Naseeruddin Shah as Ajay Narang, the main antagonist.
Shahrukh Khan as Roop Singh Rathod
Pooja Bhatt as Pooja
Anupam Kher as Shambunath Singh Rathod, Roop's father.
Ramya Krishnan as Reshma Narang, Ajay Narang's sister the secondary antagonist.
Avtar Gill as Pooja's maternal uncle (friendly appearance)
Mushtaq Khan as Anna
Tiku Talsania as Traffic Cop
Pankaj Berry as Raja (cameo appearance)
Anant Jog as Minister K.K Singh
Razak Khan as Pooja's brother (cameo appearance)
Shrivallabh Vyas as Patel
Sharad Sankla as Charlie, Pooja's brother. (cameo appearance)
Laxmikant Berde as Bhaaji Rao (cameo appearance)
Omkar Kapoor as Vicky
Amrit Patel as Pooja's paternal uncle.
Naushaad Abbas as Fighter

Soundtrack 
The music of the album was composed by Anu Malik. Songs like "Chaahat Na Hoti" and "Nahi Lagta" became famous.

Box office 
It is the 14th-highest-grossing film of 1996 worldwide.

India 
It opened on Friday, 21 June 1996, across 190 screens, and earned  nett on its opening day. It grossed  nett in its opening weekend, and had a first week of  nett. The film earned a total of  nett, and was declared "Below Average" by Box Office India. It is the 15th-highest-grossing film of 1996 in India.

Overseas 
It grossed $250,000 (87.50 lakh) outside India. Overseas, It is the 4th-highest-grossing film of 1996.

References

External links 

1996 films
1990s Hindi-language films
Films scored by Anu Malik
Films directed by Mahesh Bhatt
Films set in hotels
Hindi films remade in other languages